Aaron J. Leonard is an American author with a particular focus on the history of radicalism and state suppression.

Biography
Leonard was born in Herkimer, New York. He has a BA in Social Sciences and History. He graduated, magna cum laude, from New York University in 2012. He lives in Los Angeles.

Works
He is the author of Heavy Radicals: The FBI’s Secret War on America’s Maoists (Zer0 Books 2015) and A Threat of the First Magnitude—FBI Counterintelligence & Infiltration: From the Communist Party to the Revolutionary Union.(Repeater Books, 2018).

In 2020 he published The Folk Singers and the Bureau (Repeater Books). Joe Pagetta, writing in America magazine said, "Aaron J. Leonard’s new book, The Folk Singers and the Bureau, draws from almost 10,000 pages of F.B.I. files on an array of folk artists. It aims to illustrate the considerable impact that the U.S. government’s campaign against Communism had on folk artists in the 1940s and early ’50s." Daniel Rosenberg, in American Communist History wrote: "Aaron J. Leonard has contributed a solid piece of research to the history of FBI repression of the Communist Party USA by tracing the surveillance, investigation, and harassment of folk singers, many of whom belonged or were sympathetic to the Party."

In February 2023 he will publish  Whole World in an Uproar: Music, Rebellion & Repression - 1955-1972 (Repeater Books).

References

Living people

Year of birth missing (living people)
20th-century American historians
21st-century American historians
New York University alumni
Historians of communism